Farasan Island (transliterated: Jazyrat Farasan) is the largest island of the Farasan Islands, in the Red Sea. It is located some 50 km offshore from Jizan, the far southwestern part of Saudi Arabia and is among the largest islands in the Red Sea. The main town on the island is Farasan. The "Farasan island marine sanctuary" has been created around the island to protect biodiversity.

Farasan General Hospital 

Farasan General Hospital was built in September 1986 by the Saudi government. Chaired under Dr. Ahmed (MBBS, Neurosurgeon), it has 35 doctors for various specialization. Advanced facilities (i.e. x-rays, ultra-sounds) are available here.

Kunnah 
Kunnah, a festive fishing season is derived from the Arabic word for kingfish, kana’ad. Kunnah season startes at the beginning of summer and finishes with the end of June. It witnesses an abundance of different types of fish including but not limited to the kingfish and parrotfish or Hipposcarus harid. The fishing seasons combined represent 35 percent of fish production in the Red Sea and 20 percent of the Saudi Arabia’s fish production.

During the festival, Jazan looks like a floating city due to the large number of fishing boats and the lights from the ships make sea becoming illuminated at night. Jazan region produces about 11,000 metric tons of fish annually and employees over 3,200 fishermen working along the coasts and helping the  economy of 17 fishing ports. It uses about 1,657 boats, resulting in the investment in fisheries and helping preserving the fishing profession.

Jizan to Farasan 

Ferry passage is free. The ferry carries 35–40 cars and can accommodate about 800 people. New ferries were put into service in 2006, cutting travel time between Jizan and Farasan from three hours to one. There are two ferry trips each way daily (Farasan to Jizan at 7:30 AM and 03:30 PM, Jizan to Farasan also at 7:30 AM and 03:30 PM, .)

The  carry up to twelve passengers. The  take an hour to make the crossing and operate by hire rather than on a fixed schedule, with at a cost of SR50 per passenger with a minimum charge of SR350.

References

External links 
 
  
 
 
 Photo of the beach on Farasan Island
 Photo of Farasan Island's antiquities
 Photo of Farasan Island's antiquities

Islands of the Red Sea
Islands of Saudi Arabia
Jizan Province